Vyacheslav Vladimirovich Pozdnyakov (born 17 June 1978 in Yaroslavl) is a Russian fencer, who has won bronze Olympic medal in the team foil competition at the 2004 Summer Olympics in Athens.

References

External links
Profile at fie.ch

1978 births
Living people
Sportspeople from Yaroslavl
Russian male fencers
Fencers at the 2004 Summer Olympics
Olympic fencers of Russia
Olympic bronze medalists for Russia
Olympic medalists in fencing
Medalists at the 2004 Summer Olympics